General elections were held in Trinidad and Tobago on 18 September 1950. The result was a victory for the Butler Party, which won 6 of the 18 seats. Voter turnout was 70.1%.

Results

References

Trinidad and Tobago
Elections in Trinidad and Tobago
1950 in Trinidad and Tobago